This is a list of historic houses in Florida.

Brevard County
Benson House
Green Gables
H. S. Williams House
Dr. George E. Hill House
James Wadsworth Rossetter House
Nannie Lee House
Pink House
Porcher House
Pritchard House
Judge George Robbins House
Roesch House
Spell House
Taylor-Dunn House
Wager House
William H. Gleason House
Winchester Symphony House

Hillsborough County
A. M. Lamb House
A. P. Dickman House
George Guida, Sr. House
George McA. Miller House
Horace T. Robles House
House at 84 Adalia Avenue
House at 97 Adriatic Avenue
House at 36 Aegean Avenue
House at 53 Aegean Avenue
House at 59 Aegean Avenue
House at 124 Baltic Circle
House at 125 Baltic Circle
House at 132 Baltic Circle
House at 202 Blanca Avenue
House at 220 Blanca Avenue
House at 418 Blanca Avenue
House at 161 Bosporous Avenue
House at 301 Caspian Street
House at 36 Columbia Drive
House at 200 Corsica Avenue
House at 116 West Davis Boulevard
House at 131 West Davis Boulevard
Hutchinson House (Tampa, Florida)
Jackson Rooming House
Johnson-Wolff House
Leiman House
Moseley Homestead
Seminole Heights Residential District
Stovall House
Tampania House
T. C. Taliaferro House
William E. Curtis House

Lee County
Edison and Ford Winter Estates

Miami-Dade County
William Wagner House

Orange County
Robert Bruce Barbour House

Palm Beach County
Riddle House

Pinellas County
Plumb House

Polk County
Rev. Wm James Reid House

Volusia County

Alexander Haynes House
All Saints Episcopal Church (Enterprise, Florida)
Amos Kling House
Anderson–Price Memorial Library Building
Ann Stevens House
Bartholomew J. Donnelly House
Chief Master at Arms House
DeBary Hall
Delos A. Blodgett House
Dix House
El Real Retiro
Howard Thurman House
John Anderson Lodge
John B. Stetson House
Kilkoff House
Lippincott Mansion
Louis P. Thursby House
Mary McLeod Bethune Home
Moulton–Wells House
Nathan Cobb Cottage
Rogers House (Daytona Beach, Florida)
Rowallan
Seminole Rest
Seth French House
Stockton-Lindquist House
Talahloka
The Abbey (Daytona Beach, Florida)
The Casements
Cypress Street Elementary School
The Hammocks
The Porches

See also
List of historic houses
National Register of Historic Places listings in Florida

Historic houses in Florida
Historic sites in Florida